Meppen is a village in the Netherlands and is part of the Coevorden municipality in Drenthe.

Meppen was first mentioned around 1335. The etymology is unknown. Traces of an esdorp dating from 5,000 BC have been discovered near the hamlet. In 1840, it was home to 238 people.

References 

Coevorden
Populated places in Drenthe